Mario Abdo Benítez (born 10
November 1971) is a Paraguayan politician who has served as the president of Paraguay since 2018. He was previously a senator and  President of the Senate.

Early life and education
Abdo Benítez was born in Asunción on 10 November 1971 and is the son of Ruth Benítez Perrier and Mario Abdo Benítez Sr. His father's ancestry is Lebanese.

At 16 years old, Abdo Benítez moved to the United States. He then completed his university studies at Teikyo Post University in Waterbury, Connecticut, obtaining a degree in marketing. Upon completion of his secondary schooling in 1989 he joined the Paraguayan Armed Forces, obtaining the rank of Second Lieutenant of Reserve Aviation and in turn was appointed by the Air Force Command as a paratrooper.

Early political career
His first steps in politics were in 2005 as a member of the Republican National Reconstruction movement. He was later a member of the Peace and Progress movement and won the Vice Presidency of the Colorado Party in 2005. In June 2015, he was elected president of the Senate of Paraguay.

Abdo Benítez has faced criticism for his relationship with the military dictatorship of Alfredo Stroessner, as his father was Stroessner's private secretary. When Stroessner died in 2006, Abdo Benítez was one of the pallbearers at his funeral in Brasília, and Abdo Benítez later proposed that the Governing Board of the Colorado Party pay tribute to Stroessner. The fortune Abdo Benítez owns was inherited from his father, who after the fall of the dictatorship was prosecuted for illicit enrichment, but the case was eventually dismissed. Abdo Benítez has stated that while he believes that Stroessner "did a lot for the country", he also clarified that he does not condone the violations of human rights, torture and persecution committed during the regime.

Presidency

Election
In December 2017, Abdo Benítez won the Colorado Party presidential primaries by defeating former Minister of Finance Santiago Peña with 564,811 votes (50.93%) to 480,114 (43.29%). In April 2018, Abdo Benítez won the 2018 elections by defeating Efraín Alegre, with 46.46% of the votes to Alegre's 42.73%. At 46 years of age Benítez became, by a mere month's margin to Nicanor Duarte, the youngest President of Paraguay since Alfredo Stroessner, at 41, assumed power in 1954.

Abdo Benítez was inaugurated as president on August 15, 2018. His predecessor Horacio Cartes, with whom he was in conflict, was not present at the ceremony.

Domestic policy

He supported the reform of the judicial system, considered corrupt. Like his opponent at the elections Alegre, he opposes the legalization of abortion and same-sex marriage, though he stated to be "open" to a "debate" on abortion.

In mid-2019, he faced the possibility of an impeachment procedure for having signed an agreement with Brazilian President Jair Bolsonaro on the Itaipu Dam, which was considered to be clearly unfavourable for Paraguay. He finally had this agreement cancelled, defusing the impeachment process.

On economic issues, Abdo Benitez's government continues the policy pursued for a century in favor of large landowners. Abdo Benitez's government designed a tax reform that was approved by Congress in September 2019. In 2019, the Paraguayan economy went into recession.

One year after taking office, the government has experienced a high rate of disapproval of its management (69.3% in August 2019). As a result, the phrase "Desastre ko Marito" (a mixture of Guarani and Spanish roughly meaning "Marito is a disaster") became widespread in use, spawning merchandising. Abdo Benítez has jokingly referenced the phrase on occasion.

In June 2022, 81% of those polled rated President Mario Abdo Benitez negatively. On the other hand, some 70% of those polled believe that Paraguay "needs profound changes", 19% think that Paraguay needs stability and 9% that the country needs moderate changes.

Foreign policy

In September 2018, he annulled the decision of his predecessor to transfer the Paraguayan embassy from Tel Aviv to Jerusalem, stating that he had not been consulted, and declared that he had taken this decision believing it to "contribute to the intensification of regional and international diplomatic efforts in the goal of achieving an enlarged, just and lasting peace in the Middle East". This decision led to tensions with the Israeli government, which responded by closing its embassy in Paraguay.

In January 2019, he broke off diplomatic relations with Venezuela and recognized Venezuelan opposition leader and National Assembly President Juan Guaidó as President of the country. He received Guaidó at the presidential palace in Asunción.

Personal life
His first marriage was to Fátima María Díaz, with whom he had two sons. Following their divorce, he married Silvana López Moreira, with whom he has one son.

Honors
Benítez was awarded the Order of Brilliant Jade with Grand Cordon by President of the Republic of China Tsai Ing-wen on 8 October 2018. During the ceremony, Tsai mentioned the role that Benítez's father held in the Stroessner government, which established bilateral relations. Also he was awarded the Order of Merit of the Italian Republic with Grand Cordon by President of the Republic of Italy on 19 January 2023.

References

External links

  (campaign site)
 Biography by CIDOB (in Spanish)
 

|-

|-

1971 births
Living people
People from Asunción
Paraguayan people of Lebanese descent
Paraguayan Roman Catholics
Colorado Party (Paraguay) politicians
Presidents of Paraguay
Presidents of the Senate of Paraguay
21st-century Paraguayan politicians
Post University alumni